Charles McCallum (died 10 August 1930) was a Scottish professional footballer who played as a winger. His uncle Neil and his son Denis both played for Celtic.

References

Scottish footballers
Association football outside forwards
Burnley F.C. players
English Football League players
1930 deaths
Vale of Leven F.C. players
Renton F.C. players
Workington A.F.C. players
Dumbarton Harp F.C. players